Transport in Stockholm consists of roads, buses, metro, commuter rail, Inter-city rail, regional rail, light rail, tram, commuter ferry and an archipelago boat operation in Stockholm County, Sweden. The bus and rail is organized by Storstockholms Lokaltrafik (Stockholm Transport, literally: Greater Stockholm Public Transport), SL, which is owned by the Stockholm County Council. The operation and maintenance of the public transport systems are delegated by SL to several contractors. The archipelago boat traffic is handled by Waxholmsbolaget.

The airport rapid public transport systems are handled both privately and by SL, with Flygbussarna providing airport bus services, Arlanda Express providing airport express train service to Arlanda, while SL handles commuter rail and tram services to Arlanda and Bromma Airport respectively, in addition to multiple local buses that serve Arlanda.

Roads

Stockholm is at the junction of the European routes E4, E18 and E20. A half-completed motorway ring road exists on the south, west and north sides of the City Centre. The northern section of the ring road, Norra Länken, opened for traffic in 2015 while the final subsea eastern section is being discussed as a future project. A bypass motorway for traffic between Northern and Southern Sweden, Förbifart Stockholm, is being built. The many islands and waterways make extensions of the road system both complicated and expensive, and new motorways are often built as systems of tunnels and bridges.

Congestion charges 

Stockholm has a congestion pricing system, the Stockholm congestion tax, in use on a permanent basis since 1 August 2007, after having had a seven-month trial period in the first half of 2006. The City Centre is within the congestion tax zone. All the entrances and exits of this area have unmanned control points operating with automatic number plate recognition. All vehicles entering or exiting the congestion tax affected area, with a few exceptions, have to pay 10–20 SEK (1.09–2.18 EUR, 1.49–2.98 USD) depending on the time of day between 06:30 and 18:29. The maximum tax amount per vehicle per day is SEK 60 (EUR 6.53). Payment is done by various means within 14 days after one has passed one of the control points; one cannot pay at the control points.

After the trial period was over, consultative referendums were held in Stockholm Municipality and several other municipalities in Stockholm County. The then-reigning government (Persson Cabinet) stated that they would only take into consideration the results of the referendum in Stockholm Municipality. The opposition parties (Alliance for Sweden) stated that if they were to form a cabinet after the general election—which was held the same day as the congestion tax referendums—they would take into consideration the referendums held in several of the other municipalities in Stockholm County as well. The results of the referendums were that the Stockholm Municipality voted for the congestion tax, while the other municipalities voted against it. The opposition parties won the general election and a few days before they formed government (Reinfeldt Cabinet) they announced that the congestion tax would be reintroduced in Stockholm, but that the revenue would go entirely to road construction in and around Stockholm. During the trial period and according to the agenda of the previous government the revenue went entirely to public transport.

Buses

There are over 500 bus lines in Stockholm County.  There are three different kinds of bus lines that differ from regular bus lines.
Inner-city blue bus lines
Suburban blue bus lines
Service bus lines

The blue buses are in the inner city variant trunk lines traversing large parts of the Stockholm inner city, and in the suburban variant acting as important feeder lines between the suburbs and public transport hubs in central Stockholm, or providing crossway connections between suburbs. These are called blue bus lines because the buses that operate on them are painted blue, in contrast to the red color of the regular buses.
The service bus lines are especially adapted for elderly people, and are found in certain residential areas. Along some parts of these lines instead of regular bus stops there are areas where one can halt the bus just by waving at them. In addition to this, there are also night busses, which replace the regular bus routes during the night, during which they do not run. These lines always have some variation of X9X as their number, such as 197, 91, and 291. 

Buses in Stockholm have a punctuality of around 92 percent.

Blue bus lines

Metro

The Stockholm Metro consists of three groups of lines (blue, red, green), which are each referred to as a singular line.

The Stockholm metro has been called 'the world's longest art gallery', with most of the network's 100 stations decorated with sculptures, mosaics, paintings, installations, engravings and reliefs.

Commuter rail

There are six commuter rail lines. These pass through  Stockholm City Station located beneath T-Centralen, unlike other trains of the railroad network that pass through Stockholm Central Station.

Light rail

There are two systems classified as "light rail" in Stockholm by the SL, the Roslagsbanan, an old narrow gauge rail system, and the Saltsjöbanan with standard gauge rail, both not being connected to the main railroad network. The entire Saltsjöbanan is currently replaced by buses due to construction work on the line, with it being slated to open again in early 2024, although not the full line to slussen until a few years later.  Roslagsbanan is planned to be extended directly to T-Centralen via a new tunnel.

Trams

There are four tram systems in Stockholm and only two of them, Nockebybanan and the new Tvärbanan are connected and share depot and rolling stock. The vehicles primarily used on these lines are a localized version of the Bombardier Flexity Swift; CAF Urbos trams have also been ordered.

There is one heritage tram line operational, Djurgården line. The infrastructure is owned by SL, but the cars are owned and operated by the Swedish Tramway Society. All SL fares are valid.

Ferry

 there are four commuter ferry lines in Stockholm, administrated by SL. Some are run by Waxholmsbolaget under SL supervision.

Archipelago boats
Transport across the islands of archipelago is operated by Waxholmsbolaget. The boats depart from Strömkajen, Vaxholm, Stavsnäs, Årsta brygga, and Nynäshamn.

Regional and intercity rail
There are also regional and InterCity trains going on the mainlines between Stockholm and cities outside the county. These cities include Uppsala, Gävle, Eskilstuna, Linköping, Västerås. These train are run by SJ on their own, and SJ tickets or special combination tickets called TiM (SJ+SL) are valid.

Local transportation
Arlanda is since 2012 served by the commuter train (Pendeltåg) to Stockholm and Uppsala. The trip takes 38 minutes to Stockholm Central Station and 18 minutes to Uppsala.  there is a supplemental fee of 120 SEK for passing through the railway station at the airport.

Airport transport

The rapid public transport to and from the airports in Stockholm are handled a bit separately than the regular land based public transport as handled by SL, thus they have their own tickets and pricing structure. It is also possible to take regular public transport to and from the airports, but that typically means one has to change between some buses or trains and the trip takes more time.

Arlanda Airport 
Being the largest airport in Sweden, it is connected to Stockholm by several means. Arlanda Express provides an airport rail link service between the airport and Stockholm Central Station. It is by far the fastest connection, but also the most expensive. Other possibility is to take a commuter train (Pendeltåg) No. 40 that passes through the airport on its shuttling between Uppsala and Stockholm City Station, but a special fee is applied. This is because Arlanda Express has been built as a public–private partnership project, with the winner having a monopoly on rail transport to the airport. Other rail operators like SL are therefore obliged to pay fees to Arlanda Express. Flygbussarna provides shuttle bus connection from airport to cityterminalen.

Other airports 
Bromma Airport is connected via tram line 31 (Tvärbanan). Flygbussarna provides an airport bus service to and from all four airports associated with Stockholm: Stockholm-Arlanda Airport, Stockholm-Bromma Airport, Stockholm-Skavsta Airport, and Stockholm-Västerås Airport.

See also

Planka.nu
Trams in Stockholm
Transport in Sweden

References

External links
 2021 SL Rail Network Map (pdf)
  2021 Waxholmsbolaget Ferry Network Map (pdf)
 Traffic and Public Transport on City of Stockholm
 Central Stockholm public transportation map (Swedish only)

Stockholm
Transport in Stockholm
Stockholm